Agnostrup is a genus of centipedes in the family Mecistocephalidae, native to Europe and Asia. These centipedes range from 2 cm to 3 cm in length. All species in this genus have 41 leg-bearing segments.

Species 
Currently accepted species include:
Agnostrup paucipes Miyosi, 1955
Agnostrup striatus Takakuwa, 1949
Agnostrup striganovae Titova, 1975

References 

Geophilomorpha